Knox v. Lee, 79 U.S. (12 Wall.) 457 (1871), was an important case for its time in which the Supreme Court of the United States overruled Hepburn v. Griswold. In Knox v. Lee, the Court held that making paper money legal tender through the Legal Tender Act did not conflict with Article I of the United States Constitution.

Mrs. Lee was a loyal citizen of the United States whose flock of sheep was sold by the Confederate Army, as the Confederates considered Mrs. Lee an "alien enemy". Mr. Knox purchased the sheep from the Confederate army, and Mrs. Lee brought suit for trespass and conversion. The Court instructed the jury that whatever amount they awarded could be paid with legal tender notes of the United States. Mr. Knox appealed, as he contended that this instruction was equivalent to telling the jury to add a premium for the discount of paper currency relative to specie.

Parker v. Davis was resolved in the same decision, in which Davis wished to compel specific performance requiring Parker to convey a lot to Davis in return for payment of money. The Court decreed that Davis should pay money into the Court, and Parker was to execute a deed to Davis. Davis paid United States notes, but Parker refused to execute a deed and claimed that he was entitled to receive coin.

See also

 List of United States Supreme Court cases, volume 79
 Legal Tender Cases
 Willard v. Tayloe (1869)
 West v. Barnes (1791)

References

External links
 

1871 in United States case law
United States Constitution Article One case law
United States Supreme Court cases
United States Supreme Court cases of the Chase Court
United States Supreme Court decisions that overrule a prior Supreme Court decision
Banknotes of the United States